The American Boathouse is a historic boathouse on Atlantic Avenue in Camden, Maine.  Built in 1904, it is one of the nation's oldest recreational boathouses.  It was built to house the  yacht of Chauncey Borland, the first commodore of the Camden Yacht Club.  It was listed on the National Register of Historic Places in 1982.  In early 2015, it was listed for sale at $2.5 million.

Description and history
The American Boathouse is located at the head of Camden's harbor area on the Megunticook River, just east of a public park and southeast of the Camden Public Library.  It consists of a long rectangular wood frame structure, with a large entrance bay at its southern (harbor) end, and a hip-roofed square structure at the street end, which houses the office.  The boat entrance bay is fitted with a large door, and the building's sides are lined with sash windows.  It is topped by a gabled roof and clad in wooden shingles.  The office structure has a street-facing doorway, with a sash window to the right.

The boathouse was built in 1904, and is possibly the oldest recreational boathouse in the state.  It was built by Chauncy Borland to house his  steam-powered yacht Maunaloa.

See also
National Register of Historic Places listings in Knox County, Maine

References

Transportation buildings and structures on the National Register of Historic Places in Maine
Boathouses on the National Register of Historic Places
Buildings and structures completed in 1904
Buildings and structures in Camden, Maine
Boathouses in the United States
National Register of Historic Places in Knox County, Maine
Transportation buildings and structures in Knox County, Maine